1973 in professional wrestling describes the year's events in the world of professional wrestling.

List of notable promotions 
Only one promotion held notable shows in 1973.

Calendar of notable shows

Notable events
April 14 -  Japan Pro Wrestling Alliance closed.
September 6 - Carlos Colon , Victor Jovica and Gorilla Monsoon launched Capitol Sports Promotions in Puerto Rico.
December 1 - Stan Stastak wins the WWWF Heavyweight title from Pedro Morales in Philadelphia, PA
December 10 - Bruno Sammartino becomes the first two time WWWF Heavyweight Champion when he defeated Stan Stastak in New York, NY.

Awards and honors

Pro Wrestling Illustrated

Championship changes

EMLL

NWA

Births
Date of birth uncertain:
Dudley Dudley 
 January 9 - Magnum Tokyo
 January 25 - Ace Steel
 January 26 - The Maestro
 February 8 - Raziel (died in 2022)
 February 11 – Hernandez
 February 21 - Brodus Clay 
 February 22 - Mr. Niebla (died in 2019) 
 February 28 – Masato Tanaka
 March 7 - Brazo de Platino 
 March 8 - Aya Koyama (died in 2018) 
 March 11 - Wataru Sakata 
 March 20 - Scott Vick
 March 23 - Kevin Northcutt 
 March 28 – Umaga (died in 2009)
 April 24 - StarBuck 
 April 27 - E. Z. Money 
 May 8 - Giant Ochiai (died in 2003) 
 May 18 – Kaz Hayashi
 May 18 - The Blue Meanie 
 May 29 – Steve Corino
 June 4: 
Mikey Whipwreck 
Pablo Marquez 
 June 19 - Lou Marconi
 July 2 – Scotty 2 Hotty
 July 13:
Necro Butcher
Wifebeater 
 July 26 - Yukio Sakaguchi
 August 12 – Jonathan Coachman
 August 25 - José Estrada Jr.
 August 27 – Jazz
 August 29 - Sinn Bodhi 
 August 31 - Tank Toland
 September 22 - Bob Sapp
 September 24 - Bison Smith (died in 2011) 
 September 30 - Cerebro Negro 
 October 4 – Abyss
 October 16 – Justin Credible
 October 19 - Corporal Punishment 
 October 26 – Taka Michinoku
 October 28 – Montel Vontavious Porter
 October 30 – Edge
 November 3 - Chase Tatum (died in 2008) 
 November 20 - Becca Swanson 
 November 27 – Evan Karagias
 November 30 – Christian
 December 3 – Super Crazy
 December 7 – Hack Meyers (died in 2015) 
 December 7 - Wolfie D 
 December 20 – Toscano
 December 25 – Chris Harris

Retirements
 Dory Funk, Sr. (April 26, 1973)

Debuts
 Uncertain debut date 
 Randy Savage 
 Sika Anoa'i 
 Bob Backlund
 Ray Candy
 Hector Guerrero
 Smith Hart
 Dean Hart
 Bruiser Brody
 Don Kernodle
 Dennis Condrey
 Gene Petit
 Pez Whatley 
 January 1 - Stan Hansen

Deaths
 February 10 - Everett Marshall, 67
 March 8 - Bill Malone (broadcaster), 48
 April 1 – Jim Crockett, 63
 June 3 – Dory Funk, 54
 July 21 - Wild Red Berry, 66
 July 31 - Azumafuji Kin'ichi, 51
 December 1 – Black Guzmán, 57
 December 17 - Kazuo Okamura, 62

References

 
professional wrestling